Wide Bay is a bay of the Coral Sea off the coast of the localities of Rainbow Beach and Cooloola, both in the Gympie Region, Queensland, Australia.

History 
Wide Bay was charted and named by Lieutenant James Cook on 18 May 1770 on his 1770 voyage along the east coast of Australia on the HM Bark Endeavour.

References 

Bays of Queensland
Coral Sea
Gympie Region